Aston Shakespeare Football Club was an English football club from Aston, then in Staffordshire, England.

History

The club seems to have taken its name from the Shakespeare Inn in nearby Park Lane.  The club's original playing fields near Aston Cross were built by Edwin Samson Moore, who had set up the Midland Vinegar Company in 1874, and later bought the rights to HP Sauce.  Shakespeare's first recorded match is a 2-1 defeat at Aston Victoria in 1879.

The Astonians first entered the Birmingham Senior Cup in 1884-85, beating Asbury 7-1 at home in the first round, but losing 9-1, again at home, to Walsall Town in the second.

1887-88 proved  to be the club's high water mark in competitions.  For the only time in its history, the club played the FA Cup, having had an entry for the 1886-87 competition refused after it was posted too late.  In the first round, the club was drawn to play Burton Wanderers, but a sign of the club's difficulties was shown by the crowd being a mere 1,500; at the same stage, 2,000 were at Small Heath, 3,000 at Oldbury Town, and nearly 5,000 at Walsall Town.  The Shakespearians were two goals to the good at half-time, but lost 3-2 thanks to two late goals.

However, following a protest, the Football Association ordered the match to be replayed; the FA upheld 16 separate protests at the same stage over the eligibility of players.  Rather than return to Aston Cross, the Wanderers scratched from the competition, and played a more lucrative friendly against Derby St Luke's instead.

In the second round, the club was drawn away at Wolverhampton Wanderers, and despite the Wolves being reduced to 10 men for the second half, Shakespeare went out by three goals to nil.

Decline

The club's problem was similar to that of other clubs in the area, namely, the dominance of local professional clubs, in particular Aston Villa.  Once the Football League was started, member clubs could pay more, and Shakespeare constantly had "emissaries of big clubs buzzing around them".  The club had also never been able to capture the popular imagination, only 300 attending a match against Willenhall Pickwick just before the FA Cup tie with Burton.

At the end of the 1887-88 season, the club "lost three or four of their best men" and were said to be "going down hill fast".  In 1888-89, the club went out of the FA Cup at the second qualifying round stage to Warwick County, with the club being criticized for rough play", and in the Birmingham Senior Cup at the third qualifying round stage to Shrewsbury Town.

The club had at least enough notoriety to be considered for inclusion in merit tables produced by newspapers, but the Staffordshire Sentinel had the club bottom, with a goal average of 0.64 from 31 matches.

The final match of any importance played by the club was the semi-final of the Warwick Cup in 1888-89, a 6-0 defeat to Small Heath.  At the close of the season, two more players had been "poached" by Villa, and although one fixture was advertised the following season, against the obscure Hearts of Oak, there is no evidence the match was played.

Colours

There is no presently available source confirming the club's colours.  However, when the club played Birmingham St George's in 1885, the Dragons, whose first choice colour was white shirts, instead wore maroon and pale blue; it is therefore possible that Shakespeare also had white shirts.

Grounds

The club originally played on fields near the Aston Cross clock tower, and in the mid-1880s briefly played at Thimblemill Lane, on fields owned by John Wright.  By 1887 the club was back at Aston Cross.

Notable players

Henry Dyoss, later joined Walsall Swifts
"Bat" Garvey, Aston Villa player in 1888

Honours

FA Cup

Best season: 2nd round, 1887–88

Birmingham Senior Cup

Best season: 3rd round (final 16), 1887–88

References

Defunct football clubs in England
Sport in Birmingham, West Midlands
Defunct football clubs in the West Midlands (county)
Football clubs in Birmingham, West Midlands